Crestmont is a residential neighbourhood in the southwest quadrant of Calgary, Alberta. It is located at the western edge of the city, south of the Trans-Canada Highway.

It is represented in the Calgary City Council by the Ward 1 councillor.

Demographics

See also
List of neighbourhoods in Calgary

References

External links

Neighbourhoods in Calgary